Permosynidae is a formal assemblage of beetle fossils consisting only of isolated elytra with punctate striae. Species that were discovered in 2014 include Artematopodites latissimus, Platycrossos latus, Platycrossos longus, Platycrossos loxonicus, Platycrossos mongolicus, Platycrossos ovum and Dzeregia platis. Species that were discovered in 2015 include Artematopodites lozowskii and Dinoharpalus latus.

Taxonomy
After:
 Alveolacupes  (also spelled Alveolicupes)
 Alveolacupes primus 
 Alveolacupes secundes 
 Artematopodites 
 Artematopodites crispulus 
 Artematopodites insculptus 
 Artematopodites latissimus 
 Artematopodites latus 
 Artematopodites lepidus 
 Artematopodites leskoviensis 
 Artematopodites longus 
 Artematopodites lozowskii 
 Artematopodites major 
 Artematopodites maximus 
 Artematopodites prolixus 
 Artematopodites propinquus 
 Artematopodites shaanbeiensis 
 Bistrisyne 
 Bistrisyne tenua 
 Delpuentesyne 
 Delpuentesyne menendezi 
 Diarcuipenna 
 Diarcuipenna bennettitophila 
 Diarcuipenna heterosa 
 Dinoharpalus 
 Dinoharpalus coptoclavoides 
 Dinoharpalus latus 
 Dinoharpalus liasinus 
 Dinoharpalus martynovi 
 Dinoharpalus rugosus 
 Dzeregia 
 Dzeregia ampla 
 Dzeregia byrrhoides 
 Dzeregia crassa 
 Dzeregia juxta 
 Dzeregia lata 
 Dzeregia longa 
 Dzeregia pilula 
 Dzeregia platis 
 Dzeregia striata 
 Hydrobiites 
 Hydrobiites anglicus 
 Hydrobiites bellus 
 Hydrobiites convexus 
 Hydrobiites crassus 
 Hydrobiites dobbertinensis 
 Hydrobiites giebeli 
 Hydrobiites handlirschi 
 Hydrobiites liasinus 
 Hydrobiites longus 
 Hydrobiites minor 
 Hydrobiites minutissimus 
 Hydrobiites mongolicus 
 Hydrobiites permianus 
 Hydrobiites punctatostriatus 
 Hydrobiites purbeccensis 
 Hydrobiites sulcatus 
 Hydrobiites tillyardi 
 Hydrobiites veteranus 
 Hydrobiites vladimiri 
 Ischichucasyne 
 Ischichucasyne cladocosta 
 Ischichucasyne santajuanaensis 
 Palademosyne 
 Palademosyne martynovae 
 Palademosyne natalensis 
 Permocrossos 
 Permocrossos elongatus 
 Permosyne 
 Permosyne affinis 
 Permosyne belmontensis 
 Permosyne dentata 
 Permosyne elongata 
 Permosyne mitchelli 
 Permosyne rasnitsyni 
 Platycrossos 
 Platycrossos caroli 
 Platycrossos elongatus 
 Platycrossos latus 
 Platycrossos ligulatus 
 Platycrossos longus 
 Platycrossos loxonicus 
 Platycrossos mongolicus 
 Platycrossos ovum 
 Platycrossos petalus 
 Platycrossos punctatus 
 Platycrossos subtumidus 
 Platycrossos tumidus 
 Pseudorhynchophora 
 Pseudorhynchophora convexa 
 Pseudorhynchophora olliffi 
 Sakmaracoleus 
 Sakmaracoleus orenburgensis 
 Tychtocoleus 
 Tychtocoleus europaeus 
 Tychtocoleus neuburgae 
 Tychtocoleus popovi 
 Umkomaasia 
 Umkomaasia depressa

References

 
†
Taxa named by Robert John Tillyard
Prehistoric insect families